The Catholic Church holds no official position on the theory of creation or evolution, leaving the specifics of either theistic evolution or literal creationism to the individual within certain parameters established by the Church. According to the Catechism of the Catholic Church, any believer may accept either literal or special creation within the period of an actual six-day, twenty-four-hour period, or they may accept the belief that the earth evolved over time under the guidance of God. Catholicism holds that God initiated and continued the process of his creation, that Adam and Eve were real people, and that all humans, whether specially created or evolved, have and have always had specially created souls for each individual.

Early contributions to biology were made by Catholic scientists such as the Augustinian friar Gregor Mendel. Since the publication of Charles Darwin's On the Origin of Species in 1859, the attitude of the Catholic Church on the theory of evolution has slowly been refined. For nearly a century, the papacy offered no authoritative pronouncement on Darwin's theories. In the 1950 encyclical Humani generis, Pope Pius XII confirmed that there is no intrinsic conflict between Christianity and the theory of evolution, provided that Christians believe that God created all things and that the individual soul is a direct creation by God and not the product of purely material forces. , the Church supports theistic evolution, also known as evolutionary creation, although Catholics are free not to believe in any part of evolutionary theory.

Catholic schools in the United States and other countries teach evolution as part of their science curriculum. They teach the fact that evolution occurs and the modern evolutionary synthesis, which is the scientific theory that explains how evolution proceeds.

Early contributions to evolutionary theory

Catholics' contributions to the development of evolutionary theory included those of the Augustinian monk Gregor Mendel (1822-1884). Mendel entered the Brno Augustinian monastery in 1843, but also trained as a scientist at the Olmutz Philosophical Institute and at the University of Vienna. The Brno monastery was a centre of scholarship, with an extensive library and tradition of scientific research. At the monastery, Mendel discovered the basis of genetics following long study of the inherited characteristics of pea plants, although his paper Experiments on Plant Hybridization, published in 1866, remained largely overlooked until the start of the next century. 

He developed mathematical formulae to explain the occurrence, and confirmed the results in other plants. Where Darwin's theories suggested a mechanism for improvement of species over generations, Mendel's observations provided explanation for how a new species itself could emerge. Though Darwin and Mendel never collaborated, they were aware of each other's work (Darwin read a paper by Wilhelm Olbers Focke which extensively referenced Mendel). Bill Bryson writes that "without realizing it, Darwin and Mendel laid the groundwork for all of life sciences in the twentieth century. Darwin saw that all living things are connected, that ultimately they trace their ancestry to a single, common source; Mendel's work provided the mechanism to explain how that could happen".  Biologist J. B. S. Haldane and others brought together the principles of Mendelian inheritance with Darwinian principles of evolution to form the field of genetics known as the modern evolutionary synthesis.

Changing awareness of the age of the Earth and fossil records helped in the development of evolutionary theory. The work of the Danish scientist Nicolas Steno (1638-1686), who converted to Catholicism and became a bishop, helped establish the science of geology, leading to modern scientific measurements of the age of the Earth.

Early reaction to Charles Darwin's theories
Catholic concern about evolution has always been very largely concerned with the implications of evolutionary theory for the origin of the human species; even by 1859, a literal reading of the Book of Genesis had long been undermined by developments in  geology and other fields. No high-level Church pronouncement has ever attacked head-on the theory of evolution as applied to non-human species although a bishop of the church did excommunicate Gregorio Chil y Naranjo for his scientific work defending Darwin and Lamarck.

Even before the development of modern scientific method, Catholic theology had allowed for biblical text to be read as allegorical, rather than literal, where it appeared to contradict that which could be established by science or reason. Thus Catholicism has been able to refine its understanding of scripture in light of scientific discovery. Among the early Church Fathers there was debate over whether God created the world in six days, as Clement of Alexandria taught, or in a single moment as held by Augustine, and a literal interpretation of Genesis was normally taken for granted in the Middle Ages and later, until it was rejected in favour of uniformitarianism (entailing far greater timeframes) by a majority of geologists in the 19th century. However, modern literal creationism has had little support among the higher levels of the Church.

The Catholic Church delayed official pronouncements on Darwin's Origin of Species for many decades. While many hostile comments were made by local clergy, Origin of Species was never placed on the Index Librorum Prohibitorum; in contrast, Henri Bergson's non-Darwinian Creative Evolution (1907) was on the Index from 1948 until the Index was abolished in 1966. However, a number of Catholic writers who published works specifying how evolutionary theory and Catholic theology might be reconciled ran into trouble of some sort with the Vatican authorities.  According to the historian of science and theologian Barry Brundell: "Theologians and historians of science have always been struck by the seemingly enigmatic response of Rome when it did come; the authorities were obviously unhappy with the propagation of 'Christianized evolution', but it seems they were not willing or able to say so straight out and in public".  H.L. Mencken observed that:

19th century reception among Catholics

The first notable statement after Darwin published his theory in 1859 appeared in 1860 from a council of the German bishops, who pronounced:

The concentration of concern on the implications of evolutionary theory for the human species was to remain typical of Catholic reactions.  No Vatican response was made to this, which some have taken to imply agreement. No mention of evolution was made in the pronouncements of the First Vatican Council in 1868. In the following decades, a consistently and aggressively anti-evolution position was taken by the influential Jesuit periodical La Civiltà Cattolica, which, though unofficial, was generally believed to have accurate information about the views and actions of the Vatican authorities. The opening in 1998 of the Archive of the Congregation for the Doctrine of the Faith (in the 19th century called the Holy Office and the Congregation of the Index) has revealed that on many crucial points this belief was mistaken, and the periodical's accounts of specific cases, often the only ones made public, were not accurate. The original documents show the Vatican's attitude was much less fixed than appeared to be the case at the time.

In 1868, John Henry Newman, later to be made Cardinal, corresponded with a fellow priest regarding Darwin's theory and made the following comments:

In 1894 a letter was received by the Holy Office, asking for confirmation of the Church's position on a theological book of generally Darwinist cast by a French Dominican theologian, L'évolution restreinte aux espèces organiques, par le père Léroy dominicain. The records of the Holy Office reveal lengthy debates, with a number of experts consulted, whose views varied considerably. In 1895 the Congregation decided against the book, and Fr. Léroy was summoned to Rome, where it was explained that his views were unacceptable, and he agreed to withdraw the book. No decree was issued against Léroy's book, and consequently the book was never placed on the Index. Again, the concerns of the experts had concentrated entirely on human evolution.

To reconcile general evolutionary theory with the origin of the human species, with a soul, the concept of "special transformism" was developed, according to which the first humans had evolved by Darwinist processes, up to the point where a soul was added by God to "pre-existent and living matter" (in the words of Pius XII's Humani generis) to form the first fully human individuals; this would normally be considered to be at the point of conception. Léroy's book endorsed this concept; what led to its rejection by the Congregation appears to have been his view that the human species was able to evolve without divine intervention to a fully human state, but lacking only a soul. The theologians felt that some immediate and particular divine intervention was also required to form the physical nature of humans, before the addition of a soul, even if this was worked on near-human hominids produced by evolutionary processes.

The following year, 1896, John Augustine Zahm, a well-known American Holy Cross priest who had been a professor of physics and chemistry at the Catholic University of Notre Dame, Indiana, and was then Procurator General of his Order in Rome, published Evolution and Dogma, arguing that Church teaching, the Bible, and evolution did not conflict. The book was denounced to the Congregation of the Index, who decided to condemn the book but did not publish the corresponding decree, and consequently, the book was never included on the Index. Zahm, who had returned to the United States as Provincial superior of his Order, wrote to his French and Italian editors in 1899, asking them to withdraw the book from the market; however, he never recanted his views. In the meantime his book (in an Italian translation with the imprimatur of Siena) had had a great impact on Geremia Bonomelli, the Bishop of Cremona in Italy, who added an appendix to a book of his own, summarizing and recommending Zahm's views. Bonomelli too was pressured, and retracted his views in a public letter, also in 1898.

Zahm, like St. George Jackson Mivart and his followers, accepted evolution, but not the key Darwinist principle of natural selection, which was still a common position among biologists in general at the time.  Another American Catholic author William Seton accepted natural selection also, and was a prolific advocate in the Catholic and general press.

Pope Pius IX

On the Origin of Species was published in 1859, during the papacy of Pope Pius IX, who defined dogmatically papal infallibility during the First Vatican Council in 1869–70. The council has a section on "Faith and Reason" that includes the following on science and faith:

On God the Creator, the First Vatican Council was very clear. The definitions preceding the "anathema" (as a technical term of Catholic theology, let him be "cut off" or excommunicated, cf. Galatians 1:6–9; Titus 3:10–11; Matthew 18:15–17) signify an infallible doctrine of the Catholic Faith (De Fide):

According to Catholic theologian Dr. Ludwig Ott in his 1952 treatise Fundamentals of Catholic Dogma, it is to be understood that these condemnations are of the errors of modern materialism (that matter is all there is), pantheism (that God and the universe are identical), and ancient pagan and gnostic-manichean dualism (where God is not responsible for the entire created world, since mere "matter" is evil not good, see Ott, page 79).

The First Vatican Council also upholds the ability of reason to know God from his creation:

Popes Leo XIII and Pius X

Pope Leo XIII, who succeeded in 1878, was known to advocate a more open approach to science, but also to be frustrated by opposition to this within the Vatican and leading church circles, "lamenting on a number of occasions, and not in a particularly private way, the repressive attitudes to scholars exhibited by people around him, and among those he clearly included members of La Civiltà Cattolica college of writers".  On one occasion there was "quite a scene when the Pope energetically refused to have the writings of Mons. D'Hulst of Paris put on the Index of Forbidden Books".

Providentissimus Deus, "On the Study of Holy Scripture", was an encyclical issued by Leo XIII on 18 November 1893 on the interpretation of Scripture. It was intended to address the issues arising from both the "higher criticism" and new scientific theories, and their relation with Scripture. Nothing specific concerning evolution was said, and initially both those in favour and against evolution found things to encourage them in the text; however a more conservative interpretation came to be dominant, and the influence of the conservative Jesuit Cardinal Camillo Mazzella (with whom Leo had argued over Mons. D'Hulst) detected. Leo stressed the unstable and changing nature of scientific theory, and criticised the "thirst for novelty and the unrestrained freedom of thought" of the age, but accepted that the apparent literal sense of the Bible might not always be correct. In biblical interpretation, Catholic scholars should not "depart from the literal and obvious sense, except only where reason makes it untenable or necessity requires". Leo stressed that both theologians and scientists should confine themselves to their own disciplines as much as possible.

An earlier encyclical of Leo's on marriage, Arcanum Divinae Sapientiae (1880), had described in passing the Genesis account of the creation of Eve from Adam's side as "what is to all known, and cannot be doubted by any."

The Pontifical Biblical Commission issued a decree ratified by Pope Pius X on June 30, 1909, that stated that the literal historical meaning of the first chapters of Genesis could not be doubted in regard to "the creation of all things by God at the beginning of time; the special creation of man; the formation of the first woman from the first man; the unity of the human race". As in 1860, "special creation" was only referred to in respect of the human species.

Pope Pius XII
Pope Pius XII's encyclical of 1950, Humani generis, was the first encyclical to specifically refer to evolution and took up a neutral position, again concentrating on human evolution:

Pope Pius XII's teaching can be summarized as follows:
 The question of the origin of man's body from pre-existing and living matter is a legitimate matter of inquiry for natural science. Catholics are free to form their own opinions, but they should do so cautiously; they should not confuse fact with conjecture, and they should respect the Church's right to define matters touching on Revelation.
 Catholics must believe, however, that humans have souls created immediately by God. Since the soul is a spiritual substance it is not brought into being through transformation of matter, but directly by God, whence the special uniqueness of each person.
 All men have descended from an individual, Adam, who has transmitted original sin to all mankind. Catholics may not, therefore, believe in "polygenism", the scientific hypothesis that mankind descended from a group of original humans (that there were many Adams and Eves).

Some theologians believe Pius XII explicitly excludes belief in polygenism as licit. Another interpretation might be this: As we have nowadays in fact models of thinking of how to reconcile polygenism with the original sin, it need not be condemned. The relevant sentence is this:

Pope John Paul II

In an October 22, 1996, address to the Pontifical Academy of Sciences, Pope John Paul II updated the Church's position to accept evolution of the human body:

In the same address, Pope John Paul II rejected any theory of evolution that provides a materialistic explanation for the human soul:

Pope Benedict XVI
Statements by Cardinal Christoph Schönborn, a close colleague of Benedict XVI, especially a piece in The New York Times on July 7, 2005, appeared to support Intelligent Design, giving rise to speculation about a new direction in the Church's stance on the compatibility between evolution and Catholic doctrine; many of Schönborn's complaints about Darwinian evolution echoed pronouncements originating from the Discovery Institute, an interdenominational Christian think tank. However, Cardinal Schönborn's book Chance or Purpose (2007, originally in German) accepted with certain qualifications the "scientific theory of evolution", but attacked "evolutionism as an ideology", which he said sought to displace religious teaching over a wide range of issues. Nonetheless, in the mid-1980s, Prefect of the Sacred Congregation of the Doctrine of the Faith Joseph Ratzinger wrote a defense of the doctrine of creation against Catholics who stressed the sufficiency of "selection and mutation." Humans, Ratzinger writes, are "not the products of chance and error," and "the universe is not the product of darkness and unreason; it comes from intelligence, freedom, and from the beauty that is identical with love."

The Church has deferred to scientists on matters such as the age of the earth and the authenticity of the fossil record. Papal pronouncements, along with commentaries by cardinals, have accepted the findings of scientists on the gradual appearance of life. In fact, the International Theological Commission in a July 2004 statement endorsed by Cardinal Ratzinger, then president of the Commission and head of the Congregation for the Doctrine of the Faith, includes this paragraph:

The Church's stance is that any such gradual appearance must have been guided in some way by God, but the Church has thus far declined to define in what way that may be. Commentators tend to interpret the Church's position in the way most favorable to their own arguments. The ITC statement includes these paragraphs on evolution, the providence of God, and "intelligent design":

In addition, while he was the Vatican's chief astronomer, Fr. George Coyne issued a statement on 18 November 2005 saying that "Intelligent design isn't science even though it pretends to be. If you want to teach it in schools, intelligent design should be taught when religion or cultural history is taught, not science." Cardinal Paul Poupard added that "the faithful have the obligation to listen to that which secular modern science has to offer, just as we ask that knowledge of the faith be taken in consideration as an expert voice in humanity." He also warned of the permanent lesson we have learned from the Galileo affair, and that "we also know the dangers of a religion that severs its links with reason and becomes prey to fundamentalism." Fiorenzo Facchini, professor of evolutionary biology at the University of Bologna, called intelligent design unscientific, and wrote in the January 16–17, 2006 edition L'Osservatore Romano: "But it is not correct from a methodological point of view to stray from the field of science while pretending to do science. ...It only creates confusion between the scientific plane and those that are philosophical or religious." Kenneth R. Miller is another prominent Catholic scientist widely known for opposing Young Earth Creationism and Intelligent Design. He writes, concerning Emeritus pope Benedict XVI, that "The Holy Father's concerns are not with evolution per se, but with how evolution is to be understood in our modern world. Biological evolution fits neatly into a traditional Catholic understanding of how contingent natural processes can be seen as part of God's plan ...a careful reading suggests that the new pope will give quarter neither to the enemies of spirituality nor the enemies of evolutionary science. And that's exactly as it should be."

In a commentary on Genesis authored as Cardinal Ratzinger titled In the Beginning... Benedict XVI spoke of "the inner unity of creation and evolution and of faith and reason" and that these two realms of knowledge are complementary, not contradictory:

In a book released in 2008, his comments prior to becoming Pope were recorded as:

On September 2–3, 2006 at Castel Gandolfo, Pope Benedict XVI conducted a seminar examining the theory of evolution and its impact on Catholicism's teaching of Creation. The seminar is the latest edition of the annual "Schülerkreis" or student circle, a meeting Benedict has held with his former Ph.D. students since the 1970s. The essays presented by his former students, including natural scientists and theologians, were published in 2007 under the title Creation and Evolution (in German, Schöpfung und Evolution). In Pope Benedict's own contribution he states that "the question is not to either make a decision for a creationism that fundamentally excludes science, or for an evolutionary theory that covers over its own gaps and does not want to see the questions that reach beyond the methodological possibilities of natural science", and that "I find it important to underline that the theory of evolution implies questions that must be assigned to philosophy and which themselves lead beyond the realms of science."

In July 2007 at a meeting with clergy Pope Benedict XVI noted that the conflict between "creationism" and evolution (as a finding of science) is "absurd:" 

In commenting on statements by his predecessor, he writes "it is also true that the theory of evolution is not a complete, scientifically proven theory." Though commenting that experiments in a controlled environment were limited as "we cannot haul 10,000 generations into the laboratory", he does not endorse Young Earth Creationism or intelligent design. He defends theistic evolution, the reconciliation between science and religion already held by Catholics. In discussing evolution, he writes that "The process itself is rational despite the mistakes and confusion as it goes through a narrow corridor choosing a few positive mutations and using low probability.... This ... inevitably leads to a question that goes beyond science.... Where did this rationality come from?" to which he answers that it comes from the "creative reason" of God.

The 150th anniversary of the publication of the Origin of Species saw two major conferences on evolution in Rome: a five-day plenary session of the Pontifical Academy of Sciences in October/November 2008 on Scientific Insights Into the Evolution of the Universe and of Life and another five-day conference on Biological Evolution: Facts and Theories, held in March 2009 at the Pontifical Gregorian University.  These meetings generally confirmed the lack of conflict between evolutionary theory and Catholic theology, and the rejection of Intelligent Design by Catholic scholars.

On the evening of his death on December 31, 2022, the Holy See published the spiritual testament of Benedict XVI, which was witten on August 29, 2006. 
In regards to natural sciences, he wrote:

Pope Francis
On October 27, 2014, Pope Francis issued a statement at the Pontifical Academy of Sciences that "Evolution in nature is not inconsistent with the notion of creation," warning against thinking of God's act of creation as "God [being] a magician, with a magic wand able to do everything."

The Pope also expressed in the same statement the view that scientific explanations such as the Big Bang and evolution in fact require God's creation:

"God is not... a magician, but the Creator who brought everything to life,” Francis said. “Evolution in nature is not inconsistent with the notion of creation, because evolution requires the creation of beings that evolve.”

Catholic teaching and evolution

The Catechism of the Catholic Church (1994, revised 1997) on faith, evolution and science states:

Despite these general sections on scientific discussion of the origins of the world and of man, the Catechism does not explicitly discuss the theory of evolution in its treatment of human origins.  Paragraph 283 has been noted as making a positive comment regarding the theory of evolution, with the clarification that "many scientific studies" that have enriched knowledge of "the development of life-forms and the appearance of man" refers to mainstream science and not to "creation science".

Concerning the doctrine on creation, Ludwig Ott in his Fundamentals of Catholic Dogma identifies the following points as essential beliefs of the Catholic faith ("De Fide"):
 All that exists outside God was, in its whole substance, produced out of nothing by God.
 God was moved by His Goodness to create the world.
 The world was created for the Glorification of God.
 The Three Divine Persons are one single, common Principle of the Creation.
 God created the world free from exterior compulsion and inner necessity.
 God has created a good world.
 The world had a beginning in time.
 God alone created the world.
 God keeps all created things in existence.
 God, through His Providence, protects and guides all that He has created.

Some Catholic theologians, among them Pierre Teilhard de Chardin, Piet Schoonenberg, and Karl Rahner, have discussed the problem of how evolutionary theory relates to the doctrine of original sin.  They generally question the idea of a human fall from an original state of perfection and a common theme among them, most explicitly stated by Rahner, is to see Adam's sin as the sin of the entire human community, which provides a resolution of the problem of polygenism.

Evolution in Catholic schools 

Catholic schools in the United States and other countries teach evolution as part of their science curriculum. They teach that evolution occurs and the modern evolutionary synthesis, which is the scientific theory that explains how evolution proceeds. This is the same evolution curriculum that secular schools teach. Bishop Francis X. DiLorenzo of Richmond, chair of the Committee on Science and Human Values, wrote in a letter sent to all U.S. bishops in December 2004: "Catholic schools should continue teaching evolution as a scientific theory backed by convincing evidence. At the same time, Catholic parents whose children are in public schools should ensure that their children are also receiving appropriate catechesis at home and in the parish on God as Creator. Students should be able to leave their biology classes, and their courses in religious instruction, with an integrated understanding of the means God chose to make us who we are."

A survey of principals and teachers of science and of religion at Catholic high schools in the United States indicates some attitudes toward the teaching of evolution and the results of that teaching.  86% of principals reported their schools took an integrated approach to science and religion, in which "evolution, the Big Bang, and the Book of Genesis" were addressed together in classes.  On specific topics, 95% of science teachers and 79% of religion teachers agreed that "evolution by natural selection" explains "the diversity of life on earth".  Only 21% of science teachers and 32% of religion teachers believed that "Adam and Eve were real historical people".  A companion survey of Catholic adults found that 65% of those who had attended a Catholic high school believed in evolution compared to 53% of those who did not attend.

Unofficial Catholic organizations

There have been several organizations composed of Catholic laity and clergy which have advocated positions both supporting evolution and opposed to evolution, as well as individual figures such as Bruce Chapman. For example:
 The Kolbe Center for the Study of Creation operates out of Mt. Jackson, Virginia, and is a Catholic lay apostolate promoting creationism.
 The "Faith Movement" was founded by Catholic priests Fr. Edward Holloway and Fr. Roger Nesbitt in Surrey, England, and "argues from Evolution as a fact, that the whole process would be impossible without the existence of the Supreme Mind we call God."
 The Daylight Origins Society was founded in 1971 by John G. Campbell (d.1983) as the Counter Evolution Group. Its goal is "to inform Catholics and others of the scientific evidence supporting Special Creation as opposed to Evolution, and that the true discoveries of Science are in conformity with Catholic doctrines." It publishes the "Daylight" newsletter.
 The Center for Science and Culture of the Discovery Institute was founded, in part, by Catholic biochemist Michael Behe, who is currently a senior fellow at the Center.

Fr. Pierre Teilhard de Chardin, S.J., offers Catholics insight into the relation between Catholic faith and evolution theory. Despite occasional objections to aspects of his thought, Teilhard was never condemned by the magisterial church.

The website "catholic.net", successor to the "Catholic Information Center on the Internet", sometimes features polemics against evolution. Many "traditionalist" organizations are also opposed to evolution, see e.g. the theological journal Living Tradition (theological journal).

See also

 Creation and evolution in public education
 Catholic Church and science
 Hindu views on evolution
 Islamic views on evolution
 Jainism and non-creationism
 Jewish views on evolution
 Relationship between religion and science
 Erich Wasmann

References

References
 Appleby, R. Scott. Between Americanism and Modernism; John Zahm and Theistic Evolution, in Critical Issues in American Religious History: A Reader, Ed. by Robert R. Mathisen, 2nd revised edn., Baylor University Press, 2006, . Google books
 Artigas, Mariano; Glick, Thomas F., Martínez, Rafael A.; Negotiating Darwin: the Vatican confronts evolution, 1877–1902, JHU Press, 2006, 9780801883897, Google books
Brundell, Barry, "Catholic Church Politics and Evolution Theory, 1894-1902", The British Journal for the History of Science, Vol. 34, No. 1 (Mar., 2001), pp. 81–95, Cambridge University Press on behalf of The British Society for the History of Science, JSTOR
 Harrison, Brian W., Early Vatican Responses to Evolutionist Theology, Living Tradition, Organ of the Roman Theological Forum, May 2001.
Morrison, John L., "William Seton: A Catholic Darwinist", The Review of Politics, Vol. 21, No. 3 (Jul., 1959), pp. 566–584, Cambridge University Press for the University of Notre Dame du lac, JSTOR
 O'Leary, John. Roman Catholicism and modern science: a history, Continuum International Publishing Group, 2006,  Google books
Scott, Eugenie C., "Antievolution and Creationism in the United States", Annual Review of Anthropology, Vol. 26, (1997), pp. 263–289, JSTOR

Further reading
 Bennett, Gaymon, Hess, Peter M. J. and others, The Evolution of Evil, Vandenhoeck & Ruprecht, 2008, Google books
  (google books)
Hess, Peter M.J., Evolution, Suffering, and the God of Hope in Roman Catholic Thought after Darwin, in The Evolution of Evil (contains summary history of RC reaction; other pieces in the book are also relevant), 2008, Editors:Gaymon Bennett, Ted Peters, Martinez J. Hewlett, Robert John Russell; Vandenhoeck & Ruprecht, 9783525569795, Google books
 Küng, Hans, The beginning of all things: science and religion, trans. John Bowden, Wm. B. Eerdmans Publishing, 2007, . Google books
 Olson, Richard, Science and religion, 1450–1900: from Copernicus to Darwin, Greenwood Publishing Group, 2004, . Google books
Rahner, Karl, ed. Encyclopedia of Theology: A Concise Sacramentum Mundi, entry on "Evolution", 1975, Continuum International Publishing Group, 9780860120063, google books

External links
 Vatican Council I (1869–70), the full documents.
 Evolutionary Creation: A Christian Approach to Evolution by Denis Lamoureux (St. Joseph's College, Edmonton)
 1913 Catholic Encyclopedia: Catholics and Evolution and Evolution, History and Scientific Foundation of
 Pope Pius XII, Humani generis, 1950 encyclical
 Roberto Masi, "The Credo of Paul VI: Theology of Original Sin and the Scientific Theory of Evolution" (L'Osservatore Romano, 17 April 1969).
 Pope John Paul II, general audience of 10 July 1985. "Proofs for God's Existence are Many and Convergent".
 Cardinal Ratzinger's Commentary on Genesis Excerpts from In the Beginning: A Catholic Understanding of the Story of Creation and the Fall.
 International Theological Commission (2004). "Communion and Stewardship: Human Persons Created in the Image of God".
 Cardinal Paul Poupard, "Vatican Cardinal: Listen to What Modern Science has to Offer", November 3, 2005.
 Mark Brumley, "Evolution and the Pope, of Ignatius Insight
 John L. Allen Teaching of Benedict XVI on Evolution before becoming Pope.
 Benedict XVI's inaugural address.
 Pontifical Academy of Sciences

Catholic Church and science
Christianity and evolution